Epimesophantia is a genus of moths in the Epipyropidae family.

Species 
Epimesophantia dlabolai Krampl, 1983

Former species
Epimesophantia schawerdae (Zerny, 1929)

References

Epipyropidae
Zygaenoidea genera